Carlos López Moctezuma Pineda (19 November 1909 – 14 July 1980) was a Mexican film actor. He appeared in more than 210 films between 1938 and 1980. He starred in the film Happiness, which was entered into the 7th Berlin International Film Festival.

Selected filmography

 The Whip (1939)
 The Unknown Policeman (1941)
 The Rock of Souls (1942)
 The Count of Monte Cristo (1942)
 Simón Bolívar (1942)
 Red Konga (1943)
 The Queen of the Tropic (1946)
 Hidden River (1948)
 Maclovia (1948)
 Angels of the Arrabal (1949)
 Midnight (1949)
 Immaculate (1950)
 María Montecristo (1951)
 The Naked Woman (1953)
 A Divorce (1953)
 The Proud and the Beautiful (1953)
 Take Me in Your Arms (1954)
 Happiness (1957)
 Una cita de amor (1958)
 La maldición de la llorona (1961)
 House of Women (1966)
 A Faithful Soldier of Pancho Villa (1967)
 La Gran Aventura Del Zorro (1976)
 Perro callejero (1978)
 Como México no hay dos (1979)

References

External links

1909 births
1980 deaths
Best Actor Ariel Award winners
Mexican male film actors
20th-century Mexican male actors